Patrick Sweeney is an American gunsmith (retired), originally from Detroit, Michigan. According to an interview with Shotgun World magazine, he is a well-known author in the field of gunsmithing. Retired from gunsmithing, he writes full-time.  He teaches law enforcement classes on the patrol rifle, and gunsmithing the AR-15.

In addition to writing books, he was the Handguns Editor of Guns & Ammo magazine from 2007 through 2017. He was co-host of Handguns in its inaugural season, and has been a contributor to Guns & Ammo TV since 2007.

Bibliography
 
 Gunsmithing: Rifles
 Gunsmithing: Shotguns
 Gun Digest book of Smith & Wesson
 Gun Digest Book of Ruger
 Gun Digest Book of Glock, 1st & 2nd Editions
 Gun Digest book of the AR-15, Vol 1, 2, 3 & 4
 Gunsmithing: AR-15
 1911: Vol 1&2
 1911: the first 100 years
 The Big Fat Book of the .45 ACP
 Gun Digest book of the AK & SKS
 Encyclopedia of Rifles & Machineguns (co-authored w/Will Fowler)
 Gun Digest Book of the Tactical Rifle
 Reloading for Handgunners

Notes

Year of birth missing (living people)
Living people
Gunsmiths
People from Detroit